Zuoquan is a town of Liling City in Hunan Province, China. The town was established by merging the previous Xianxia and Xinyang on November 26, 2015. As of the 2015, the town had a population of 48,100 and an area of 122.96 square kilometers.

Cityscape
The town is divided into 9 villages and 1 community, the following areas: Mojiazui Community, Shixingling Village, Qing'anpu Village, Miezhijie Village, Xianxia Village, Shanxiandian Village, Youtian Village, Zhaogaoduan Village, Yupan Village, and Dongjiangchong Village (莫家嘴社区、狮形岭村、清安铺村、蔑织街村、仙霞村、杉仙店村、油田村、赵高段村、玉潘村、东江冲村).

External links

Divisions of Liling